Township 1 is one of thirteen townships in Benton County, Arkansas, USA.

Cities, towns, villages

Avoca (part)
Garfield
Gateway
Lost Bridge Village
Prairie Creek
Rogers (part)

Cemeteries

The township contains Alpine Cemetery, Bayless Cemetery, Clantonville Cemetery, Dean Cemetery, Ford Cemetery, Liberty Cemetery, McReynolds Cemetery, Ozark Cemetery, Pratt Cemetery, Scott Cemetery, Snoderley Cemetery, Walnut Hill Cemetery, and Williams Cemetery. Two former cemeteries also exist: Henson Cemetery and Williams Cemetery.

Major routes

  US Route 62
  Arkansas Highway 12
  Arkansas Highway 37
  Arkansas Highway 127

References
 United States Census Bureau 2008 TIGER/Line Shapefiles
 United States Board on Geographic Names (GNIS)
 United States National Atlas

External links
 US-Counties.com

Townships in Benton County, Arkansas
Townships in Arkansas